Dionilso Mateus Marcon (born 21 September 1964) sometimes better known as Deputado Marcon or Marcon is a Brazilian politician as well as a farmer. He has spent his political career representing his home state of Rio Grande do Sul, having served as state representative since 2011.

Personal life
Marcon is the son of Antonio Marcon and Celia Marcon. Before becoming a politician he worked as an agriculturalist on a farm.

Political career
Marcon voted in opposition to the impeachment of then-president Dilma Rousseff. He voted in against the 2017 Brazilian labor reform, and would vote in favor of a corruption investigation into Rousseff's successor Michel Temer.

References

External links
Official Website

1964 births
Living people
People from Rio Grande do Sul
Brazilian farmers
Workers' Party (Brazil) politicians
Members of the Chamber of Deputies (Brazil) from Rio Grande do Sul